Novar may refer to:

Companies
Novar plc - the international conglomerate based in the United Kingdom, that was acquired in 2005 by Honeywell.
Novar Controls -  a subsidiary of Honeywell, and former subsidiary of Novar plc.

Places
Novar House, Highland, Scotland
Novar airfield, later HMS Fieldfare
Novar Gardens, South Australia, suburb of Adelaide